Code One is the name of the Republic of Korea Air Force aircraft which carries the President of South Korea.  The current aircraft used as Code One is one Boeing 747-8I leased from Korean Air.

Historically, the lease for Code One has been filled by either Korean Air or Asiana Airlines. It was reported in 2018 that Korean Air's lease expires in March 2021 and that a bidding process was open to secure a new lease. Government officials said that low-cost carriers might be requested to submit bids, in addition to those requested by Asiana Airlines and Korean Air.

The aircraft has undergone a "full-scale renovation" which will include "decorating the exterior", as well as customizing the interior to include a sleeping area and office, as well as reinforcement to protect the president's security.

The current presidential plane has been in service since January 2022 after extensive retrofitting and inspection. There is also an identical plane of the same type that will travel with the President at all times for security purposes and to act as a backup in case of an emergency.

Acquirement 
In 2010 as part of the VC-X program the Republic of Korea Air Force along with the Presidential Security Service leased a Boeing 747-400 from Korean Air to serve as the Code One. The contract were extended until 2021 due to administrative problem.

In March 2020, the lease for Code One ended and the bidding process from Korean Air and Asiana Airlines began and when the bidding process was concluded the South Korean Air Force and the Presidential Security Service decided that Korean Air would get the contract to provide the new Code One aircraft.

Other presidential aircraft
Before 2010, the President would travel in a reconfigured Boeing 747 provided by either Korean Air or Asiana Airlines, which would temporarily serve as the Code One, with the Presidential seal being displayed, so it was noted that the President was on board. When official use was over the aircraft was reverted to normal and used once again as a commercial aircraft.

Security 
Code One has a vast array of security measures most of which are highly classified. Code One is equipped with advanced communications and defense systems including radar-signal jammers and flares to deflect against heat-seeking missiles.

Interior
The interior of the aircraft is mostly unknown and classified, but what is known, is that the aircraft is reconfigured with an office and a bedroom among other amenities. Code One is not only meant for travel and comfort but also as a command post, that is used for the President to lead the country from anywhere in the world. It is also meant for them to fulfill their duties as the Commander in Chief and supreme authority of the armed forces.

See also
 President of South Korea
 Presidential Helicopter of South Korea
 Presidential State Car of South Korea 
 Transportation of the President of South Korea
 List of official vehicles of the president of South Korea
 Air transports of heads of state and government

References

South Korean military aircraft
Call signs